The 2020–21 Georgia Southern Eagles men's basketball team represented Georgia Southern University in the 2020–21 NCAA Division I men's basketball season. The Eagles, led by first-year head coach Brian Burg, played their home games at Hanner Fieldhouse in Statesboro, Georgia as members of the Sun Belt Conference. With the creation of divisions to cut down on travel due to the COVID-19 pandemic, they played in the East Division.

Previous season
The Eagles finished the 2019–20 season 20–13, 12–8 in Sun Belt play to finish in a tie for fourth place. They were the No. 5 seed in the Sun Belt tournament, where they defeated Louisiana and Georgia State. However, the tournament was later cancelled amid the COVID-19 pandemic.

On March 20, 2020, head coach Mark Byington resigned to become the head coach at James Madison. He finished at Georgia Southern with a seven-year record of 131–97.

Roster

Schedule and results

|-
!colspan=12 style=| Non-conference Regular season

|-
!colspan=12 style=| Conference Regular season

|-
!colspan=12 style=| Sun Belt tournament
|-

Source

References

Georgia Southern Eagles men's basketball seasons
Georgia Southern Eagles
Georgia Southern Eagles men's basketball
Georgia Southern Eagles men's basketball